The 2022 Bexley London Borough Council election took place on 5 May 2022. 45 members of Bexley London Borough Council were elected. The elections took place alongside local elections in the other London boroughs and elections to local authorities across the United Kingdom.

In the previous election in 2018, the Conservative Party maintained its longstanding control of the council, winning 34 out of the 45 seats with the Labour Party forming the council opposition with the remaining 11 seats.

Background

History 

The thirty-two London boroughs were established in 1965 by the London Government Act 1963. They are the principal authorities in Greater London and have responsibilities including education, housing, planning, highways, social services, libraries, recreation, waste, environmental health and revenue collection. Some of the powers are shared with the Greater London Authority, which also manages passenger transport, police, and fire.

Bexley has generally been controlled by the Conservatives since its creation, except for the elections of 1964, 1971 and 2002 which resulted in Labour councils, and the 1994 council election which resulted in no overall control. Most councillors for the borough have been from the Conservative and Labour parties, with a number of Liberal Democrats being elected between 1982 and 2002. Independent and UK Independence Party candidates have also been elected. In the prior election in 2018, the Conservatives maintained their longstanding control of the council, winning 34 seats while Labour won eleven. Although neither party won any seats, the Liberal Democrats received 5.7% of the vote across the borough and the UK Independence Party won 5.6% of the vote. The 2018 elections took place on new boundaries which reduced the number of councillors for the borough from 63 to 45. These boundaries remained in place for the 2022 election.

Council term 
One of the three Labour councillors for Thamesmead East, Danny Hackett, resigned from his party in 2019 to sit as an independent councillor. He blamed the party's leadership for "a culture of bullying and toxicity". Later in 2019, Hackett denied allegations against him from several women who had accused him of sexual misconduct and harassment. One of the Conservative councillors for Longlands ward, Gareth Bacon, was elected as MP for Orpington in the 2019 general election. He announced his intention to resign as a councillor in 2021, though due to the COVID-19 pandemic the by-election was not held until 6 May 2021. The Conservative candidate Lisa-Jane Moore was elected to successfully defend the seat for her party. The Member of Parliament for Old Bexley and Sidcup, a constituency covering the southern part of the borough, James Brokenshire, died in October 2021. In the ensuing by-election, the Conservative candidate was Louie French, a councillor for Falconwood and Welling, and the Labour candidate Daniel Francis was a councillor for Belvedere ward. The Conservatives held the seat on a reduced majority.

Electoral process 
Bexley, as with all other London borough councils, elects all of its councillors at once every four years, with the previous election having taken place in 2018. The election took place by multi-member first-past-the-post voting, with each ward being represented by two or three councillors. Electors had as many votes as there are councillors to be elected in their ward, with the top two or three being elected.

All registered electors (British, Irish, Commonwealth and European Union citizens) living in London aged 18 or over were entitled to vote in the election. People who lived at two addresses in different councils, such as university students with different term-time and holiday addresses, were entitled to be registered for and vote in elections in both local authorities. Voting in-person at polling stations took place from 7:00 to 22:00 on election day, and voters were able to apply for postal votes or proxy votes in advance of the election.

Councillors not standing for re-election 
A number of councillors did not stand for re-election and/or had their party whip removed due to impropriety or controversy. Councillor Danny Hackett, Thamesmead East (Labour), was an Independent councillor after allegations of sexual misconduct on social media. Councillor Adam Wildman, Blackfen & Lamorbey (Conservative) no longer sat as a Tory after being found to have participated in a lockdown-breaking party with former mayoral candidate Shaun Bailey. Councillor Dave Putson, Belvedere (Labour) also lost the whip. Councillor Linda Bailey, Crook Log (Conservative) died in office in 2022. Finally, Councillor Louie French, Falconwood & Welling (Conservative) ceased to take an allowance after being elected at the Old Bexley & Sidcup by-election of 2021. He did, however, attend the final council meeting of the 2018-2022 term.

Outcome of 2022 election 
Despite initial suggestions of around four seats changing hands from the Conservative party to the Labour party, this did not materialise. However, the previously split ward of Northumberland Heath returned two Labour candidates compared to a previous one Labour and one Conservative. Across the Borough, the vote share for the Conservative party fell by around 4%, with Labour gaining around 7%. In the seat of East Wickham, the highest placed Labour candidate was only 41 votes short of the nearest Conservative. In Crayford, that number was only 89. Many seats began to become more marginal as a result of lower turnout and increased Labour votes in some areas. The Liberal Democrats did not increase their vote share on a borough-wide basis, but did succeed in increasing their vote share in some seats.

Previous council composition

Results summary

Candidates 
Statements of persons nominated were published on 6 April. Incumbent councillors are marked with an asterisk (*). Those elected are in bold.

Barnehurst

Belvedere

Bexleyheath

Blackfen and Lamorbey

Blendon and Penhill

Crayford

Crook Log

East Wickham

Erith

Falconwood and Welling

Longlands

Northumberland Heath

Sidcup

Slade Green and Northend

St Mary's and St James

Thamesmead East

West Heath 

On 11 October 2022, Cllr John Davey was suspended by the Conservative Party following offensive tweets about former British-Iranian prisoner, Nazanin Zaghari-Ratcliffe.

References 

Council elections in the London Borough of Bexley
Bexley